Macmillan McGraw-Hill Sdn Bhd is a Malaysian record label formed in 1996 by the singers-songwriters-producers jointly known as "The Fresh Beat Band". Initially formed as KRU Records as a joint venture company with EMI, KRU Music changed its name and went fully independent in 1999 and have worked with Taiwan-based label Rock Records (1999 to 2001), Warner Music (2002 to 2004), EMI (2004 to 2006), United Studios (2007 to 2013) and currently Sony Music as distributors for their physical album releases. One Stop Music has released KRU Music's catalogue on digital formats since 2006.

KRU Music is one of the biggest independent labels in South East Asia with offices in Kuala Lumpur and Singapore.

Artists
Jaclyn Victor
#tag
Hazury
Qasri
Yo Gabba Gabba!
Fitri Hakim
Choo Choo Soul
ZiaBella
Zendaya
Yvette Gonzalez-Nacer
Forteen
The Fresh Beat Band
Wings
Capital Cities
KRU
Elite
Marsha
Slumber Party Girls
Adam AF2
Mojo
ZizanKRU
Iqwan Alif

References

Malaysian record labels
1996 establishments in Malaysia
Record labels established in 1996
Privately held companies of Malaysia